Home: Original Motion Picture Soundtrack is the soundtrack album for the 2015 animated film Home, based on the 2007 children book The True Meaning of Smekday by Adam Rex. It features songs recorded by Rihanna, Clarence Coffee Jr., Kiesza, Charli XCX, Jacob Plant, and Jennifer Lopez. It was released on March 13, 2015 through Westbury Road and Roc Nation. Following the announcement that Rihanna would star in the film, it was revealed she would release a concept album based on the animated film. As the executive producer of the soundtrack, she called on various artists to feature on the album. Rihanna's "Towards the Sun", "Dancing in the Dark", "As Real as You and Me" and Jennifer Lopez's "Feel the Light" were released as singles to promote the album and movie.

Background 
In June 2012, it was revealed that Rihanna would star as the lead role in the film Happy Smekday!, alongside American actor Jim Parsons. In September 2012, 20th Century Fox and DreamWorks Animation announced that the movie will be released for November 26, 2014. In June 2013, the film was retitled from Happy Smekday! to Home. In 2014, Variety magazine reported that, in addition to her voice role, Rihanna created a concept album for the film which will be released on March 13, 2015. It was later revealed that the film's soundtrack would also include songs recorded by Charli XCX, Kiesza and Jennifer Lopez. In a statement for MTV News Rihanna said:

"I think music is important to every film. I think it sets the tone, in the moment. It creates the sensitivity, the suspense, no matter what film it is, especially in animation. I've had an incredible time making music for this film. I've worked really closely with Tim Johnson, the director, just to make sure that lyrically, and musically the songs were matching exactly what he needed — what he needed the audience to feel in that moment."

In July 2014 singer songwriter Kiesza announced that Rihanna had record two or three of her songs for the album but was unsure if they would appear on the final project.
In September 2014, Rihanna was recording in New York City in which she was working with frequent collaborator Ester Dean.

Composition 

"Towards the Sun" performed by Rihanna, is a mid-tempo pop ballad with R&B influences that features "pounding" drums, sing-along lyrics, "gigantic" chorus, "layered harmonies", "swirling effects" and uplifting, positive lyrics. Madison Vain of Entertainment Weekly opined that the song is "anthemic" and more "whispier" than Rihanna's previous singles. According to Brittany Spanos of Rolling Stone the song is more optimistic and positive than her previous singles and albums which could be heard in the lines, "Turn your face towards the sun. Let the shadows fall behind you."

Another song performed by Rihanna; "Dancing in the Dark" is a dance-pop song with a length of three minutes and forty-three seconds. The track is an up-tempo "poppy-number" that features "enough backdrop of saccharine synths and snap beats". Rolling Stone'''s Jon Blistein linked "Dancing in the Dark"'s chorus to the one of Whitney Houston's 1987 single "I Wanna Dance with Somebody (Who Loves Me)". He also wrote that the song has a "wubby bass groove" that could feature American actress Courteney Cox dancing to it in its potential music video, a reference to her appearance in the video for Bruce Springsteen's 1984 single with the same name.

Jennifer Lopez's song, "Feel the Light" is an "uplifting" and "tender" ballad with a length of four minutes and fifty-two seconds. During the last of it, Lopez sings the lines, "Feel the light shining in the dark of night / Remember what we forgot / I know it's a longshot / But we're bringing it all back". She performed the song live on American Idol, where short clips from the film were projected onto her dress.

 Singles 
"Towards the Sun" was written by Tiago Carvalho, Gary Go, and Rihanna. Scott Mills premiered the song on BBC Radio 1 on February 9, 2015 and it was made available for digital download the same day via the iTunes Store. The song was supposed to impact U.S. Top 40/Mainstream radio on March 17, 2015, however, its release was cancelled at the last minute. Upon release it received generally positive reviews from music critics who praised its lyrics, production, chorus and Rihanna's vocals. Commercially the song was a moderate success on charts peaking at seventy six on the UK Singles Chart and twenty two on the French singles chart.

Following "Towards the Sun", "Feel the Light"  was digitally released as the second single from the soundtrack on February 25 via the iTunes Store. On February 24, a lyric video of "Feel the Light" was posted on YouTube via the DreamWorks Animation official channel. The video features Lopez in a studio while recording the song while the footage being intercut with scenes from Home. MTV UK's Michael Pell noted, "is a heart-felt ballad with the video taking us through a magical journey of friendship between the wee girl and her alien pal." On March 3, 2015, Lopez teased the song's official music video, posting images from the shoot on her Instagram account. The images showed Lopez wearing a white suit, standing in front of a green screen and sporting a braid. Erin Strecker of Billboard wrote "Naturally, the shoot appears to be quite intergalactic". Two more singles: "Dancing in the Dark" and "As Real as You and Me" by Rihanna, were released on March 5, 2015.

 Track listing 

 Notes
  signifies a co-producer
  signifies a vocal producer

Personnel

 Executive producer – Robyn Rihanna Fenty
 Executive music producers – Robyn Rihanna Fenty, Tor Hermansen, Mikkel Eriksen
 Executive in charge of music for DreamWorks Animation – Sunny Park
 A&R – Jay Brown, Tyran "Ty Ty" Smith, Omar Grant
 A&R coordination – Justin Adams
 A&R administration – Karen Console
 Creative direction – Ciarra Pardo (Fenty Corp.)
 Marketing – Dara Michelle (Roc Nation), Gabriela Schwartz (Def Jam)
 Business and legal affairs – Edward Shapiro (Westbury Road Entertainment, LLC), Christina Suarez (Roc Nation)
 Music clearances – Julie Butchko (DreamWorks Animation music department)
 Director of music – Charlene Ann Huang (DreamWorks Animation music department)
 Music coordinators – Tori Fillat (DreamWorks Animation music department), Sebastian Christie (DreamWorks Animation music department)
 Music business affairs – Kevin Breen (DreamWorks Animation music department), Emily Morchower (DreamWorks Animation music department)
 All songs mastered by – Chris Gehringer at Sterling Sound, NYC

Charts

 Release history 

See also
List of soundtracks to fictitious movies

 References 

External links
 Home'' at Discogs

2015 soundtrack albums
Roc Nation soundtracks
Albums produced by Stargate
Albums produced by Emile Haynie
Science fiction film soundtracks
Comedy film soundtracks
Various artists albums